American literature is the literature written or produced in the area of the US and its preceding colonies.

American literature may also refer to:
American Literature (journal) (established 1929), a literary journal
Inter-American literature, the comparative study of authors and texts from all the Americas
American literature (academic discipline), an academic discipline devoted to the study of American literature